Yosef Efrati (born 19 February 1897, died 8 February 1975) was an Israeli politician who served as a member of the Knesset between 1949 and 1965.

Biography
Born in Pinsk in the Russian Empire (today in Belarus), Efrati received his primary education in a heder. He made aliyah to Ottoman-controlled Palestine in 1914, and studied at an agricultural high school in Petah Tikva. In 1917 he joined the group that settled Be'er Tuvia. Between 1923 and 1925, he worked at an agricultural research station at Ben Shemen and moved to kibbutz Geva in 1925.

Efrati was a member of Hapoel Hatzair and later Mapai, as well as being one of the leaders of HaMerkaz HaHakla'i. In 1949, he was elected to the first Knesset on the Mapai list. In February 1951 he was appointed Deputy Minister of Agriculture, a role he held until 1955. He was re-elected in 1951. He was re-elected again in 1955, 1959 and 1961, before losing his seat in the 1965 elections. He died in 1975 at the age of 77.

References

1897 births
1975 deaths
Belarusian Jews
Jews from the Russian Empire
Emigrants from the Russian Empire to the Ottoman Empire
Mapai politicians
Members of the 1st Knesset (1949–1951)
Members of the 2nd Knesset (1951–1955)
Members of the 3rd Knesset (1955–1959)
Members of the 4th Knesset (1959–1961)
Members of the 5th Knesset (1961–1965)
Deputy ministers of Israel
Israeli people of Belarusian-Jewish descent